John W. Pham is an American molecular biologist and editor-in-chief of Cell, a prestigious scientific journal. He is an advocate for inclusion and diversity, and he represents LGBTQ and Asian communities.

Early life and education 
Pham was born in the U.S. a few weeks after his parents and older siblings arrived as refugees from Vietnam, and he was raised in Florida. Pham earned a B.S. in music and biochemistry from Bates College. He completed a Ph.D. at Northwestern University under advisor Erik Sontheimer. He researched the mechanisms of RNA splicing and RNA interference. His 2006 dissertation was titled Building the Drosophila RNA-induced silencing complex. Pham completed postdoctoral studies at Harvard Medical School and Brigham and Women's Hospital.

Career 
Pham joined Cell Press in 2008 as a member of Molecular Cell's editorial team. He became the editor-in-chief of Molecular Cell in 2012. In 2018, Pham succeeded Cell editor-in-chief Emilie Marcus who had departed in February 2018. In June 2019, Pham was speaker at an Elsevier Pride and 500 Queer Scientists organized event at WorldPride NYC 2019.

Personal life 
Pham is a member of the LGBT community. , Pham resides in Dorchester, Boston with his partner, Mike, and their two dogs. He likes to run and enjoys good beer.

Involvement with inclusion and diversity 
Pham has played a major role in making the Cell journal more inclusive. Since he started with Cell, he has helped shift the advisory board from roughly 20% women to 50% women. Additionally, the Cell reviewers have changed from 18% to 33% women during Pham's time with the journal. Pham's ideology is that more diverse science is better science, and including more women will lead to better ideas and talent.

References 

Living people
Year of birth missing (living people)
Bates College alumni
Northwestern University alumni
Elsevier people
Academic journal editors
American editors
American molecular biologists
21st-century American biologists
American people of Vietnamese descent
LGBT people from Florida
American LGBT scientists
American LGBT people of Asian descent
Vietnamese LGBT scientists